Menthe may be,

Minthe, a naiad
Menthe people
Menthe language

See also
Minthe (disambiguation)

Language and nationality disambiguation pages